"House of Love" is a song by American drag queen RuPaul, released in 1993 as his third major-label single, and fifth single overall from his debut album, Supermodel of the World (1993). It did not chart in the US as it was previously released as a Double A-Side to the 1992 single "Supermodel (You Better Work)".  It did however reach the Top 40 in the UK.

Critical reception
In his weekly UK chart commentary, James Masterton wrote that "House of Love" is "an unremarkable bit of disco pop that is unliklely really to progress much further - however sexy he may look on the sleeve." Alan Jones from Music Week said "this is RuPaul's finest song", adding further, "a charming, mid-tempo house groove, "House of Love" is currently thriving on the club circuit thanks to mixes by T-Empo and Eric Kupper. It should now steer its way into the Top 40." James Hamilton from the RM Dance Update described it as a "jiggly pleasant singalong".

Versions
The "Supermodel (You Better Work)" CD single featured three versions of "House of Love".

 "House of Love" (7" Radio version)
 "House of Love" (12" version)
 "House of Love" (Dub)

These tracks were the last three tracks on the CD single.

UK Maxi CD Single
 "House of Love" (Radio Edit)
 "House of Love" (T-Empo's Kitsch Bitch Club Mix)
 "House of Love" (T-Empo's Kitsch Dub)
 "House of Love" (Eric Kupper 12" Mix)
 "House of Love" (Diss Dub Mix)

The single was released in various formats, though the most common was a UK CD single. The song itself is typical of early 1990s' house music; the theme of the song expounds on RuPaul's early persona of the "drag queen with a heart of gold". It is an anthem about welcoming all different types of people into your heart.

Charts

References

1992 songs
1993 singles
RuPaul songs
Songs written by Jimmy Harry
Tommy Boy Records singles